Khiry Robinson (born December 28, 1989) is an American football running back who is currently a free agent. He last played for the Tiburones de Cancún of the Fútbol Americano de México (FAM). Robinson signed with the New Orleans Saints as an undrafted free agent in 2013. He graduated from Belton High School in Belton, TX and played college football at West Texas A&M.

College career
In 2008, Robinson played junior college football for Mesabi Range Community and Technical College (now known as Mesabi Range College) in Virginia, Minnesota, winning the Minnesota College Athletic Conference championship.  He led the division in rushing and scored the only points of the championship game.  He then attended Blinn College in Brenham, Texas, where he played on a team that also featured future Heisman trophy winner Cam Newton and won the 2009 NJCAA national championship; Robinson was a NCJAA All-American at running back.  He went on to West Texas A&M, where he played for two seasons and was named to the 2012 D2Football.com all-America team.

Professional career

New Orleans Saints
The New Orleans Saints signed Robinson as an undrafted free agent on May 13, 2013, on a tryout basis, and he survived training camp to make the team.  Robinson ran for 224 yards in 10 regular season games, and had a key role in the Saints' first-round playoff win over the Philadelphia Eagles.

In 2014, Robinson was again part of the Saints' corps of running backs.  When Mark Ingram II suffered a broken hand in Week 2, Robinson's role increased.  In a Week 5 overtime game against the Tampa Bay Buccaneers, he finished the game with a well-executed 18-yard run for a touchdown that won the game 37–31.

In 2015, Robinson continued to be a part of the Saints' running back line up.  In the Week 8 victory over the New York Giants, Khiry's season came to an end when he suffered a tibia fracture and was placed on injured reserve.  He ended the season with 56 carries for 180 yards and four touchdowns.

New York Jets
Robinson signed with the New York Jets on March 10, 2016. Robinson was waived/injured by the Jets on September 4, 2016, after suffering a broken leg in New York's final preseason game against the Philadelphia Eagles. He was re-signed by the Jets on December 7, 2016. He was placed on injured reserve on December 28, 2016, after re-injuring his leg.

On March 9, 2017, Robinson was released by the Jets.

Italy
In 2020, Robinson signed with the Bolzano Giants of the Italian Football League.

Mexico
Robinson joined the Tiburones de Cancún of the Fútbol Americano de México (FAM) ahead of the 2021 season. The season was ultimately cancelled due to the COVID-19 pandemic in Mexico, but he returned to the team in 2022.

References

External links
New Orleans Saints bio 
West Texas A&M Buffaloes bio

1989 births
Living people
People from Temple, Texas
Players of American football from Texas
American football running backs
Mesabi Range Norse football players
West Texas A&M Buffaloes football players
Blinn Buccaneers football players
New Orleans Saints players
New York Jets players
San Antonio Commanders players
American expatriate players of American football
American expatriate sportspeople in Italy
American expatriate sportspeople in Mexico